John Edwards Hill (11 June 1928 – 6 May 1997) was a British mammalogist who described 24 species and 26 subspecies during his career.

Early life and education
Hill was born on 11 June 1928 in the small hamlet of Colemans Hatch in East Sussex, England.
He was the only child of Marjorie Edwards and her husband Albert Hill.
He attended East Grinstead Grammar School on scholarship.
During World War II, his father worked as a gardener and his mother as a housekeeper.
Hill finished Grammar School after the war in 1946 at eighteen years old.

Career
After finishing school, Hill joined the Air Ministry's Meteorological Office as a Meteorological Assistant.
He then served in the Royal Air Force for two years as a Meteorological Assistant, during which he traveled to Japan, Singapore, and the Nicobar Islands.
In 1948, he began working as an Assistant Experimental Officer at the British Museum (Natural History)'s Department of Zoology.
He retired from the Museum 40 years later in 1988.
From 1974 to his death in 1997, Hill was on the editorial board of the journal Mammalia.

Hill was well-regarded for his work with bats; Australian mammalogist Tim Flannery referred to him as a "bat expert."
He described a number of bat species, including the Kitti's hog-nosed bat.
He also published major revisions of several bat genera, including Hipposideros, Philetor, Laephotis, Scotoecus, Hesperoptenus, Mystacina, as well as the mouse-tailed bat family, Rhinopomatidae.

Altogether, Hill described 24 new species of mammal and 26 subspecies.
Of that total, 13 were rodents and 37 were bats.

Awards and honors
In 1985, the American Society of Mammalogists elected Hill as an honorary member.
Several species of mammal are named after Hill, including the Hills' horseshoe bat, Hill's sheath-tailed bat, Hill's roundleaf bat, Sturnira koopmanhilli, and Hill's shrew.

Selected publications

Personal life and death
Hill married Brenda Morphew in 1955; together they had a daughter, Sandra.
He died on 6 May 1997.

References

1928 births
1997 deaths
British mammalogists
People from Hartfield
20th-century British zoologists